Dorothy Warenskjold (May 11, 1921 in Piedmont, California – December 27, 2010 in Lenexa, Kansas) was an American lyric soprano who had an active career in operas and concerts from the mid-1940s through the early 1960s. She made several recordings for Capitol Records.

Early years
Born in Piedmont, California, Warenskjold was the daughter Mr. and Mrs. William Earl Warenskjold. Her mother was a professional musician. Planning to be an attorney, she pursued pre-legal training at Mills College in Oakland, California, until her junior year, when Mabel Riegelman began giving her vocal lessons.

Career 
As an opera singer, she worked mainly with the San Francisco Opera (SFO) where she made her debut in October 1948 as Nannetta in Giuseppe Verdi's Falstaff. She performed with the SFO for the next eight consecutive seasons, performing such roles as Antonia in The Tales of Hoffmann, Cherubino in The Marriage of Figaro, Lauretta in Gianni Schicchi, Liù in Turandot, Marzelline in Fidelio, Micaëla in Carmen, Mimì in La bohème, Pamina in The Magic Flute, and Sophie in Werther. Her final appearance at the SFO was in October 1955 as Sophie in Richard Strauss's Der Rosenkavalier with Elisabeth Schwarzkopf as the Marschallin and Frances Bible as Octavian.

Warenskjold also appeared as a guest artist with several American opera companies and toured the United States with a few traveling opera companies. In addition to her work on stage, she also performed regularly on the radio and on television during the 1940s and 1950s.  She was frequently heard on the programs Harvest of Stars, The Voice of Firestone and The Railroad Hour. In 1950 she performed the roles of Antonia and Stella in the NBC Opera Theatre's television production of The Tales of Hoffmann. After retiring from singing in the early 1960s, she joined the voice faculty of the UCLA School of the Arts and Architecture where she taught for many years as an adjunct faculty member.

Recordings
One recording for which records are available is her 1954 LP recording for Capitol Records Songs of Grieg and Dvorak, George Greeley conducting the Concert Arts Orchestra (P-8247). It contained eight songs by Grieg. and seven gypsy songs and 4 love songs by Dvorak.
 A related EP containing two songs by each composer was also released (Capitol FAP-8250). (Curiously the EP reversed the composers' names.) She made a Capitol record recording with Gordon MacRae of “The Student Prince.”

References

External links

1921 births
2010 deaths
American operatic sopranos
Mills College alumni
People from San Leandro, California
UCLA School of the Arts and Architecture faculty
Singers from California
People from Lenexa, Kansas
Classical musicians from California
20th-century American women opera singers
American women academics
21st-century American women